Esther Mvondo (born 29 August 1975) is a Cameroonian sprinter. She competed in the women's 4 × 100 metres relay at the 2000 Summer Olympics.

References

1975 births
Living people
Athletes (track and field) at the 2000 Summer Olympics
Cameroonian female sprinters
Olympic athletes of Cameroon
Place of birth missing (living people)
Olympic female sprinters
20th-century Cameroonian women